Angelo Di Livio  (born 26 July 1966) is an Italian former professional football midfielder and defender. He played for several Italian clubs in Serie A throughout his career, coming to prominence with Juventus, where he won several domestic and international titles. At international level he also played for the Italian national side in two FIFA World Cups and two UEFA European Championships, reaching the final of UEFA Euro 2000.

During his playing career he was known as soldatino (toy soldier) or soldatino Di Livio, a nickname his Juventus teammate at the time Roberto Baggio gave him because of Di Livio's diminutive stature, posture, and characteristic way of running up and down the flank.

Club career
Born in Rome, Di Livio began his career with Roma in 1984. Having failed to make an appearance in his only season for the club, Di Livio played for Reggiana (1985–86), Nocerina (1986–87), Perugia (1987–89), Padova (1989–93), Juventus (1993–99) and Fiorentina (1999–2005).

His tireless running and quality crossing made him an important element in the dominant Juventus starting lineup from 1993 to 1999, during one of the most successful periods in the club's history. With Juventus, he won three scudetti (Italian A League; 1995, 1997, 1998) and one Champions League title (1996), in addition to two Italian Supercups (1995, 1997), a Coppa Italia, an UEFA Supercup (1996), and an Intercontinental Cup (1996); he also reached the final of the 1994–95 UEFA Cup.

In 1999, he moved to Fiorentina, where he captained the team to win the Coppa Italia during the 2000–01 season. In 2002, when AC Fiorentina went bankrupt and was reborn as Florentia Viola in Serie C2, Di Livio showed his dedication by being the only player to stay with the team, as he played through the depths of Italian football on the climb back to Serie A in 2004, finally retiring after the conclusion of the 2004–05 Serie A season.

International career
Di Livio was capped 40 times for Italy. He played for Italy at Euro 96, the 1998 FIFA World Cup, Euro 2000 (where Italy finished in 2nd place), and the 2002 FIFA World Cup. His first cap came on 6 September 1995 against Slovenia; his last on 18 June 2002 against South Korea. At Euro 1996, he set-up Pierluigi Casiraghi's first goal in the team's 2–1 win in the opening group match against Russia. For Italy, he was often used as a holding player to shut down games when the team was ahead, thus sealing the win.

After retirement
After retiring, Di Livio worked as a coach in the A.S. Roma Youth System (Allievi "Coppa Lazio").

Style of play
A quick, experienced, energetic, combative, reliable, and tactically versatile player, Di Livio was usually deployed on the right wing, although he was capable of playing on either flank, as either a wide midfielder, or as a full-back or wing-back, courtesy of his ability with either foot; he was also capable of playing in the centre, as a box-to-box or defensive midfielder, or even in defence. Although he was not the most naturally talented or skilled footballer from a technical standpoint, he was a highly consistent, intelligent, and disciplined player, who was known for his pace, stamina, work-rate, and strength, despite his diminutive stature. He also stood out for his tenacity, mentality, professionalism, man-marking ability, and crossing accuracy, as well as his ability to make attacking runs down the flank, but also track back, which enabled him to cover the wing effectively, and have a successful career.

Personal life
Angelo's son, Lorenzo, is also a footballer; a Roma youth product, he currently plays for Latina. His daughter, Alessia, is an electronic music producer and DJ, performing under the name ADIEL.

Endorsements
As one of the most popular footballers from his generation, Di Livio has kept his public influence and positive reputation till today. In 2011, Angelo Di Livio was named as "Brand ambassador" for SKS365's brand planetwin365.

Career statistics

Club
Source:

International
Source:

Honours

Club
Juventus
Serie A: 1994–95, 1996–97, 1997–98
Coppa Italia: 1994–95
Supercoppa Italiana: 1995, 1997
UEFA Champions League: 1995–96
UEFA Super Cup: 1996
Intercontinental Cup: 1996

Fiorentina
Coppa Italia: 2000–01
Serie C2: 2002–03
	
Perugia
Serie C2: 1987–88

International
Italy
UEFA European Championship (Runner Up): 2000

Orders
 5th Class / Knight: Cavaliere Ordine al Merito della Repubblica Italiana: 2000

References

External links

FIGC Profile  

1966 births
Living people
Footballers from Rome
Association football midfielders
Association football defenders
Italian footballers
Italy international footballers
A.C. Reggiana 1919 players
A.S. Roma players
A.C. Perugia Calcio players
Calcio Padova players
Juventus F.C. players
ACF Fiorentina players
Serie A players
Serie B players
Serie C players
UEFA Euro 1996 players
1998 FIFA World Cup players
UEFA Euro 2000 players
2002 FIFA World Cup players
UEFA Champions League winning players
Knights of the Order of Merit of the Italian Republic